Helen Thomas Dranga (1866–1927), who is also known as Carrie Helen Dranga, was a British/American painter who made paintings of Hawaii.

Personal life
Born Caroline Helen Thomas  in Oxford, England on December 28, 1866. The daughter of Mary Ann Webb and Robert Thomas, a plumber, painter and decorator.  She studied art  at the Kensington Art Academy (Royal College of Art).

She came to the United States in 1892 and on December 16, 1895 she married Theodore Dranga, a merchant who was born in Wisconsin in 1867 to parents who had immigrated from Norway. She lived in Oakland, California from 1894 until 1900, when she moved to Hawaii and in 1901 settled in Hilo, Hawaii. The Drangas had two children, Theodore Thomas born in 1901 and an adopted daughter, Mary born about 1902. Both children were born in Hawaii.

In 1927 she lived in Honolulu and worked there as an artist.

Career
She painted the Hawaiian landscape with a "remarkably sensitive touch". She also painted portraits and skyscrapers. Her paintings regularly appeared on the cover of Paradise of the Pacific magazine in the 1920s and 1930s, such as the Golden Shower Tree published in a 1927 edition. She lived in Hilo and then moved in the 1920s to Honolulu, where she died on January 3, 1927.

The Hawaii State Art Museum, the Honolulu Museum of Art and the Lyman House Memorial Museum (Hilo, Hawaii) are among the public collections holding works by Helen Thomas Dranga. Her works were included in Encounters with paradise: views of Hawaii and its people, 1778-1941 in 1992. Her paintings were said to "seem to reflect the romantic view of Hawaii" at a show at the Hawaii State Art Museum in 2014 of early 20th century paintings of Hawaii.

Notes

References

Further reading
 Forbes, David W., He Makana, The Gertrude Mary Joan Damon Haig Collection of Hawaiian Art, Paintings and Prints, Hawaii State Foundation of Culture and the Arts, 2013, pp. 23–25
 Hughes, Edan, Artists in California 1786-1940, Sacramento, Crocker Art Museum, 2002.

External links

 Smithsonian American Art Museum, Art Inventories Catalog

1866 births
1940 deaths
Artists from Hawaii
American women painters
19th-century American painters
20th-century American painters
20th-century American women artists
19th-century American women artists